The 2019 African Netball Championships was held in Cape Town from 18-23 October 2019. The tournament featured seven nations including hosts South Africa, defending champions Uganda along with Kenya, Malawi, Zambia, Lesotho and Zimbabwe in 2 pool categories. Tanzania pulled out of the tournament due to financial issues, just a day before the tournament opener against Zimbabwe. The tournament was originally supposed to have its scheduled opening match between defending champions Uganda and Zimbabwe but was called off due to the last minute withdrawal by Tanzania. The authorities later revealed that the match between hosts South Africa and Zimbabwe to be the opening match of the tournament while the tournament was later modified with round robin format.  

South Africa defeated Zambia 72-53 to win the tournament with a perfect 100 percentage winning record.

Squads 
Malawi and Uganda announced their preliminary squads in September 2019. Malawi revealed a list of 24 players in the squad and later cropped the list to 12 members. Malawi's national captain Joanna Kachilika and Thandie Galleta were rested for the tournament who were earlier named in the preliminary squad while Caroline Mtukule was appointed as stand in captain for Malawi. Uganda released a squad consisting of 22 players. In September 2019, just three weeks prior to the start of the tournament, Ugandan captain Peace Proscovia was ruled out of the tournament due to a knee injury which she sustained while playing at the Australian league. In October 2019, Dorette Badenhorst was appointed as the new head coach for South Africa following the exit of Norma Plummer.

Just a day prior to the tournament opener, Zimbabwean head coach Lloyd Makunde was sacked due to pay disputes.

Pool stage

References 

2019 in netball
Netball competitions in Africa
Netball
2019 in South African women's sport
International netball competitions hosted by South Africa
October 2019 sports events in South Africa
Sports competitions in Cape Town